Washington Township is one of twelve townships in Adams County, Indiana. As of the 2010 census, its population was 10,151.

Geography

Cities, towns, villages
 Decatur (south three-quarters)
 Monroe (north half)

Unincorporated towns
 Coppess Corner

Adjacent townships
 Root Township (north)
 Union Township (northeast)
 St. Marys Township (east)
 Blue Creek Township (southeast)
 Monroe Township (south)
 French Township (southwest)
 Kirkland Township (west)
 Preble Township (northwest)

Cemeteries
The township contains the following cemeteries: Antioch (also known as Beery or River Brethren), County Home (or Farm or Infirmary- no longer exists), Greenwood (also known as Decatur or Maplewood), First City (no longer exists), Little Family, and Roe (no longer exists).

Major highways

Airports and landing strips
 Gage Airport

Landmarks
 Stratton Park

School districts
 Adams Central Community Schools
 North Adams Community Schools

Political districts
 Indiana's 6th congressional district
 State House District 79
 State Senate District 19

References

Citations

Sources
 
 United States Census Bureau 2007 TIGER/Line Shapefiles
 United States National Atlas

External links

 Indiana Township Association
 United Township Association of Indiana

Townships in Adams County, Indiana
Townships in Indiana